Margrave Hugo of Hachberg-Sausenberg (died 1444) was the youngest son of Margrave William of Hachberg-Sausenberg and his wife, Elisabeth of Montfort-Bregenz.  After his father died in 1441, he ruled jointly with his elder brother Rudolf IV.

Hugo died in 1444, after only three years as co-ruler.  He did not have an heir; after his death, Rudolf IV ruled alone.

Margraves of Baden-Hachberg
House of Zähringen
Year of birth uncertain
1444 deaths
15th-century German people